Somethin's Cookin' is an album by saxophonist Junior Cook recorded in 1981 and released on the Muse label.

Reception 

The Allmusic review stated: "The muscular but smooth saxophonist is heard at his best on this Muse quartet release which really showcases his playing".

Track listing 
 "Fiesta Español" (Cedar Walton) – 4:58
 "Detour Ahead" (Herb Ellis, John Frigo, Lou Carter) – 4:58
 "Illusion of Grandeur" (Larry Willis) – 9:44
 "Heavy Blue" (Willis) – 4:10
 "Hindsight" (Walton) – 5:40
 "Chi-Chi" (Charlie Parker) – 5:24
 "Fiesta Español" [alternate take] (Walton) – 4:16 Bonus track on CD reissue
 "Detour Ahead" [alternate take] (Ellis, Frigo, Carter) – 7:16 Bonus track on CD reissue
 "Hindsight" [alternate take] (Walton) – 5:52 Bonus track on CD reissue
 "Chi-Chi" [alternate take] (Parker) – 5:00 Bonus track on CD reissue

Personnel 
Junior Cook – tenor saxophone
Cedar Walton – piano
Buster Williams – bass
Billy Higgins – drums

References 

Junior Cook albums
1982 albums
Muse Records albums
Albums recorded at Van Gelder Studio